Padhraic John O'Connor (born 14 July 1997) is an Irish professional footballer who plays as a centre-back for Lincoln City.

Before joining Leeds United, he spent two years in the first team for Limerick.

Early life
O'Connor was born in Limerick.

Club career

Limerick
O'Connor made his professional debut on 7 March 2015, playing the full 90 minutes in a 3–0 loss to Bohemians in the League of Ireland Premier Division. He went on to make 16 appearances in the 2015 season, scoring his first professional goal on 14 August against Cork City.

Following Limerick's relegation to the First Division, O'Connor made 23 appearances in the 2016 League of Ireland First Division in 2016, scoring two goals in the title-winning season.

Leeds United
O'Connor had trials at Crystal Palace and Leicester City, then another with Leeds United in March 2017, where he impressed then-coach Garry Monk enough to secure a -year contract for an undisclosed fee from Limerick. He initially joined the Under-23 team, but participated in the 2017–18 first team's preseason under new coach Thomas Christiansen, and was called up onto the bench for the EFL Cup match against Newport County on 22 August 2017. O'Connor was named the Leeds Under 23s squad's captain for the 2017/18 season.

Due to an injury crisis in defence, on 3 April 2018, O'Connor was named by new manager Paul Heckingbottom in Leeds' first team for their travelling squad for Leeds EFL Championship game against Fulham at Craven Cottage although he was not named among the substitutes. His first team debut (and first booking) came as a central defender alongside Pontus Jansson as Leeds came back from 0–1 down to earn a home point against Sunderland, with O'Connor earning praise for his first senior game.

On 16 April 2018, O'Connor was nominated as one of four players for Leeds United's Young Player of the Year award, which was won by Bailey Peacock-Farrell.

On 29 June 2018, O'Connor signed a new two-year contract extension at Leeds, with the option of an additional year. After his signing the contract, director of football Victor Orta said of O'Connor, "he will be a key player for Leeds United for many years to come", and that the club intended to send him out on loan for regular games.

Blackpool (loan)
On 3 July 2018, O'Connor joined EFL League One side Blackpool on loan until 31 May 2019, in order to gain first team experience. He made his debut on 4 August in Blackpool's 0–0 draw against Wycombe Wanderers. On 4 September, O'Connor scored his first goal for Blackpool, deep into injury time in a 3–3 draw at Moss Rose against Macclesfield Town in the EFL Trophy. Macclesfield emerged the victors after winning the resulting penalty shootout 5–3.

O'Connor scored his second goal of the season, on 31 October, in a 2–1 defeat to Premier League side Arsenal in the Carabao Cup at the Emirates Stadium. O'Connor was also sent off late in the same game for a tackle on Arsenal striker Pierre-Emerick Aubameyang.

His final game for Blackpool before being recalled early by Leeds came on 5 January 2019 when he started in a 0-3 FA Cup defeat against Premier League side Arsenal. In total he played 17 games for Blackpool scoring 2 goals in all competitions.

Bradford City

On 8 January 2019, O'Connor signed for Bradford City on loan until the end of the 2018–19 season after cutting his loan deal with Blackpool short. At Bradford O'Connor has had limited game time due to Rule 54.4.1 of the EFL Rules and Regulations which states that, "A maximum of 5 players registered on a temporary loan transfer can be named in the players listed on a team sheet for any individual match played under the auspices of The League."

However, after the appointment of Gary Bowyer as manager, O'Connor impressed in his short spell at Bradford playing nine games, becoming the captain for the remainder of the season under the new manager.

In June 2019 O'Connor returned to Bradford City on a three-year permanent contract. He scored his first goal for Bradford when he scored in an EFL Trophy tie against Bolton Wanderers on 3 September 2019.

In May 2021 he won four awards at the Bradford City end-of-season awards, including Player of the Year. In May 2022 he was again voted Player of the Year, as well as Player's Player of the Year. He was one of seven players offered a new contract by Bradford City at the end of the 2021–22 season.

Lincoln City
On 13 June 2022, it was announced he would join Lincoln City on a long-term contract following the expiration of his Bradford City contract. He made his Lincoln debut on the opening day of the season against Exeter City.. His first goal came against Bristol City in the EFL Cup third round on 8 November 2022.

Career statistics

Honours
Limerick
 League of Ireland First Division: 2016
Individual

 Bradford City Player of the Season: 2020–21, 2021–22
 PFAI Team of the Year: First Division 2016

References

External links

Living people
Republic of Ireland association footballers
Leeds United F.C. players
1997 births
Sportspeople from County Limerick
Limerick F.C. players
English Football League players
Irish expatriate sportspeople in England
Blackpool F.C. players
Association football defenders
Bradford City A.F.C. players
Lincoln City F.C. players